The Illinois Central Railroad , sometimes called the Main Line of Mid-America, was a railroad in the Central United States, with its primary routes connecting Chicago, Illinois, with New Orleans, Louisiana, and Mobile, Alabama, and thus, the Great Lakes to the Gulf of Mexico. A line also connected Chicago west to Sioux City, Iowa (1870). There was a significant branch to Omaha, Nebraska (1899), west of Fort Dodge, Iowa, and another branch reaching Sioux Falls, South Dakota (1877), starting from Cherokee, Iowa.

Beginning in 1850, IC was the first U.S. railroad in which construction was partially financed through a federal land grant - such financing became a key to building U.S. railroads. The Canadian National Railway acquired control of the IC in 1998, and merged its operations in 1999. Illinois Central continues to exist as a paper railroad.

History

The IC was one of the oldest Class I railroads in the United States. The company was incorporated by the Illinois General Assembly on January 16, 1836. Within a few months Rep. Zadok Casey (D-Illinois) introduced a bill in the U.S. House of Representatives authorizing a land grant to the company to construct a line from the mouth of the Ohio River to Chicago and on to Galena. Federal support, however, was not approved until 1850, when U.S. President Millard Fillmore signed a land grant for the construction of the railroad. The Illinois Central was the first land-grant railroad in the United States.

The Illinois Central was chartered by the Illinois General Assembly on February 10, 1851. Senator Stephen A. Douglas and later President Abraham Lincoln were both Illinois Central men who lobbied for it. Douglas owned land near the terminal in Chicago. Lincoln was a lawyer for the railroad. Illinois legislators appointed Samuel D. Lockwood, recently retired from the Illinois Supreme Court (who may have given both lawyers the oral examination before admitting them to the Illinois bar), as a trustee on the new railroad's board to guard the public's interest. Lockwood, who would serve more than two decades until his death, had overseen federal land monies shortly after Illinois' statehood, then helped oversee early construction of the recently completed Illinois and Michigan Canal.

Upon its completion in 1856, the IC was the longest railroad in the world. Its main line went from Cairo, Illinois, at the southern tip of the state, to Galena, in the northwest corner. A branch line went from Centralia (named for the railroad), to the rapidly growing city of Chicago. In Chicago, its tracks were laid along the shore of Lake Michigan and on an offshore causeway downtown, but land-filling and natural deposition have moved the present-day shore to the east. Track from Centralia north to Freeport would be abandoned in the 1890s, as traffic to Galena was routed via Chicago.

In 1867, the Illinois Central extended its track into Iowa. During the 1870s and 1880s, the IC acquired and expanded railroads in the southern United States. IC lines crisscrossed the state of Mississippi and went as far south as New Orleans, Louisiana, and east to Louisville, Kentucky. In the 1880s, northern lines were built to Dodgeville, Wisconsin; Sioux Falls, South Dakota; and Omaha, Nebraska. Further expansion continued into the early twentieth century.

The Illinois Central, and the other "Harriman lines" owned by E.H. Harriman by the twentieth century, became the target of the Illinois Central shopmen's strike of 1911. Although marked by violence and sabotage in the southern, midwestern, and western states, the strike was effectively over in a few months. The railroads simply hired replacements, among them African-American strikebreakers, and withstood diminishing union pressure. The strike was eventually called off in 1915.

The totals above do not include the Waterloo RR, Batesville Southwestern, Peabody Short Line or CofG and its subsidiaries. On December 31, 1925, IC/Y&MV/G&SI operated 6,562 route-miles on 11,030 miles of track; A&V and VS&P added 330 route-miles and 491 track-miles. At the end of 1970, IC operated 6,761 miles of road and 11,159 of track.

In 1960, the railroad retired its last steam locomotive, 2-8-2 Mikado #1518. On August 31, 1962, the railroad was incorporated as Illinois Central Industries, Inc. ICI acquired Abex Corporation (formerly American Brake Shoe and Foundry Co.) in 1968.

Illinois Central Gulf Railroad (1972–1988)

On August 10, 1972, the Illinois Central Railroad merged with the Gulf, Mobile and Ohio Railroad to form the Illinois Central Gulf Railroad . October 30 of that year saw the Illinois Central Gulf commuter rail crash, the company's deadliest.

At the end of 1980, ICG operated 8,366 miles of railroad on 13,532 miles of track; that year it reported 33,276 million ton-miles of revenue freight and 323 million passenger-miles. Later in that decade, the railroad spun off most of its east–west lines and many of its redundant north–south lines, including much of the former GM&O. Most of these lines were bought by other railroads, including entirely new railroads such as the Chicago, Missouri and Western Railway; Paducah and Louisville Railway; Chicago Central and Pacific Railroad; and MidSouth Rail Corporation.

In 1988, the railroad's parent company, IC Industries, spun off its remaining rail assets and changed its name to Whitman Corporation. On February 29, 1988, the newly separated ICG dropped the "Gulf" from its name and again became the Illinois Central Railroad.

Canadian National Railway (1998–present)
On February 11, 1998, the IC was purchased for about $2.4 billion in cash and shares by Canadian National Railway (CN). Integration of operations began July 1, 1999.

Locomotives

Passenger train service

Illinois Central was the major carrier of passengers on its Chicago-to-New Orleans mainline and between Chicago and St. Louis. IC also ran passengers on its Chicago-to-Omaha line, though it was never among the top performers on this route. Illinois Central's largest passenger terminal, Central Station, stood at 12th Street east of Michigan Avenue in Chicago. Due to the railroad's north–south route from the Gulf of Mexico to the Great Lakes, Illinois Central passenger trains were one means of transport during the African American Great Migration of the 1920s.

Illinois Central's most famous train was the Panama Limited, a premier all-Pullman car service between Chicago and New Orleans, with a section breaking off at Carbondale to serve St. Louis. In 1949, it added a daytime all-coach companion, the City of New Orleans, which operated with a St. Louis section breaking off at Carbondale and a Louisville section breaking off at Fulton, Kentucky. In 1967, due to losses incurred by the operation of the train, the Illinois Central combined the Panama Limited with a coach-only train called the Magnolia Star.

On May 1, 1971, Amtrak took over intercity rail service. It retained service over the IC mainline, but dropped the Panama Limited in favor of the City of New Orleans. However, since it did not connect with any other trains in either New Orleans or Chicago, Amtrak moved the route to an overnight schedule and brought back the Panama Limited name. However, it restored the City of New Orleans name in 1981, while retaining the overnight schedule. This was to capitalize on the popularity of a song about the train written by Steve Goodman and performed by Arlo Guthrie. Willie Nelson's recording of the song was #1 on the Hot Country Charts in 1984.

Illinois Central ran several other trains along the main route including The Creole and The Louisiane.

The Green Diamond was the Illinois Central's premier train between Chicago, Springfield and St. Louis. Other important trains included the Hawkeye which ran daily between Chicago and Sioux City and the City of Miami eventually running every other day between Chicago and Miami via the Atlantic Coast Line, the Central of Georgia Railroad and Florida East Coast Railway.

The Illinois Central was also a major operator of commuter trains in the Chicago area, operating what eventually became the "IC Electric" line from Randolph Street Terminal in downtown Chicago to the southeast suburbs. In 1987, IC sold this line to Metra, who operates it as the Metra Electric District. It still operates out of what is now Millennium Station, which is still called "Randolph Street Terminal" by many longtime Chicago-area residents. In honor of the Panama Limited, the Electric District appears as "Panama Orange" on Metra system maps and timetables. Additionally, the IC operated a second commuter line out of Chicago (the West Line) which served Chicago's western suburbs. Unlike the electrified commuter service, the West Line did not generate much traffic and was eliminated in 1931.

Amtrak presently runs three trains daily over this route, the City of New Orleans and the Illini and Saluki between Chicago and Carbondale. Another Illinois corridor service is planned for the former Black Hawk route between Chicago, Rockford and Dubuque. Amtrak, at the state of Illinois' request, did a feasibility study to reinstate the Black Hawk route to Rockford and Dubuque. Initial capital costs range from $32 million to $55 million, depending on the route. Once in operation, the service would require roughly $5 million a year in subsidies from the state.

On December 10, 2010, IDOT announced the route choice for the resumption of service to begin in 2014 going over mostly CN railway.

Illinois Central named trains

Company officers
Presidents of the Illinois Central Railroad have included:

 Sidney Breese, Father of the Illinois Central Railroad
 Robert Schuyler, 1851–1853
 William P. Burrall, 1853–1854
 John N. A. Griswold, 1855
 William H. Osborn, 1855–1865
 John M. Douglas, 1865–1871, 1875–1876
 John Newell, 1871–1874
 Wilson G. Hunt, 1874–1875
 William K. Ackerman, 1876–1883
 James C. Clarke, 1883–1887
 Stuyvesant Fish, 1887–1906
 James Theodore Harahan, 1906–1911
 Charles H. Markham, 1911–1918
 Charles A. Peabody, 1918–1919
 Charles H. Markham, 1919–1926
 Lawrence A. Downs, 1926–1938
 John L. Beven, 1938–1945
 Wayne A. Johnston, 1945–1966 (chairman of Illinois Central Industries to 1967)
 William B. Johnson, 1967–1969 (chairman of IC Industries to 1987)
 Alan Stephenson Boyd, 1969–1972
 William J Taylor, 1976–1983
 Harry J Bruce, 1983–1990
 Edward L. Moyers, 1990–1993
 E. Hunter Harrison, 1993–1998

Preservation

Some historic equipment owned and used by Illinois Central can be found in museums across the United States, including:

 201, a 2-4-4 tank locomotive that participated in the "Wheels A-Rolling" pageant at the Chicago Railroad Fair. Preserved on static display at Illinois Railway Museum.
 764, a 651 class 2-8-0 donated to the National Museum of Transportation, St. Louis, Missouri in 1956.
 790. Preserved on static display at Steamtown National Historic Site, believed to be in good condition that restoration to operations is feasible.
 1518. A 1500 series 2-8-2 Mikado on static display in Paducah, Kentucky. It was built by the Lima Locomotive Works in 1923 and was the last steam locomotive to run on the IC in 1960.
 2500. A 2500 class 4-8-2 preserved on static display in the Age of Steam Memorial in Centralia, Illinois.
 2542. A 2500 class 4-8-2 preserved on static display at McComb, Mississippi.
 A yard office and unique coal-fueling tower remain at the Illinois Central yards in Council Bluffs, Iowa.
 IC 8408 GP10 locomotive/IC 9426 caboose static display Homewood, IL
 IC-333, a 0-6-0 steam engine, and several passenger cars are on display just outside the historic Yazoo and Mississippi Valley Railroad Company Depot in Baton Rouge, Louisiana.
 Illinois Central GP11 #8701, along with an IC caboose, preserved on static display at the Carbondale passenger station in Carbondale, Illinois.
 Illinois Central GP11 #8733 preserved at the Monticello Railway Museum in Monticello, Illinois.
 An Illinois Central caboose and banana car are preserved at the Casey Jones Railroad Museum in Water Valley, Mississippi.
 An Illinois Central caboose is privately owned and preserved in Raymond, Mississippi at the old train depot in the center of the town.
IC combine #892, IC Day Coaches 2920 2855 2612, IC Business Car #7, IC 10-6 sleeper #3531 "Council Bluffs", IC Dorm-baggage #1906, IC #518 (MAIL STORAGE),IC Panama Limited Observation "Gulfport", ICG cement hopper #100040, IC #65018, IC bridge crane #X238,IC #X1957 Boxcar, IC #X2000 Idler Flat, IC #'s X4342 and X4352 tenders, IC X9151 Jordan Spreader, and IC cabooses 9926 9831 9880. All of which are restored and displayed at the Monticello Railway Museum in Monticello Illinois.
Illinois Central SD40X #6071 (Ex-Gulf, Mobile and Ohio) at the Monticello Railway Museum in Monticello, Illinois
Illinois Central Gulf GP8 #7738 at the Bluegrass Railroad Museum in Versailles, Kentucky
1974 Illinois Central Gulf caboose (199422) in service as IRM 9422 at the Indiana Railway Museum in French Lick, Indiana.
Illinois Central caboose on historic main street in Palestine, Illinois.
An Illinois Central Caboose can be seen in Grayville, Illinois. It has recently been painted into a generic red color.

Mississippi Central (1852–1878)
The original Mississippi Central line was chartered in 1852. Construction of the   gauge line began in 1853 and was completed in 1860, just prior to the Civil War, from Canton, Mississippi to Jackson, Tennessee. The southern terminus of the line connected to the New Orleans, Jackson and Great Northern Railroad at Canton. It also connected to the Memphis and Charleston Railroad at Grand Junction, Tennessee and the Mobile and Ohio Railroad at Jackson, Tennessee. The Mississippi Central was the scene of several military actions from 1862 to 1863 and was severely damaged during the fighting. Company president, Absolom M. West succeeded in repairing the damage and returning it to operating condition soon after the end of the War.

By 1874, interchange traffic with the Illinois Central Railroad was important enough that the IC installed a Nutter hoist at Cairo, Illinois to interchange between its standard gauge equipment broad gauge used by the Mississippi Central. This allowed the trucks to be exchanged on 16-18 freight cars per hour, and one Pullman car could be changed in 15 minutes. The original Mississippi Central line was merged into the Illinois Central Railroad subsidiary Chicago, St. Louis and New Orleans Railroad in several transactions finally completed in 1878.

Mississippi Central (1897–1967)

A line started in 1897 as the "Pearl and Leaf Rivers Railroad" was built by the J.J. Newman Lumber Company from Hattiesburg, to Sumrall. In 1904 the name was changed to the Mississippi Central Railroad . In 1906 the Natchez and Eastern Railway was formed to build a rail line from Natchez to Brookhaven. In 1909 this line was absorbed by the Mississippi Central.

For a short time during the 1920s, the line operated a service named "The Natchez Route", running trains from Natchez to Mobile, Alabama through trackage agreements with the Gulf, Mobile and Northern Railroad. At Natchez, freight cars were ferried across the Mississippi River to connect with the Louisiana and Arkansas Railway to institute through traffic into Shreveport, Louisiana. In 1967 the property of the Mississippi Central was sold to the Illinois Central Railroad.

See also

Edward Turner Jeffery, general manager, Illinois Central Railroad
David L. Gunn
Harry D. Wilson
Tammany Trace
Billups Neon Crossing Signal A unique railroad crossing signal erected in Grenada, MS
Illinois Central Missouri River Bridge, the world's longest swing bridge when constructed

References

 Stover, John F., Purdue University, The Management of the Illinois Central Railroad in the 20th Century (PDF). Retrieved February 9, 2006.
 University of Illinois at Urbana-Champaign Archives, Wayne A. Johnston Papers, 1945–1967. Retrieved February 9, 2006.

External links

Official website, archived 1999

Illinois Central Historical Society
Illinois Central Railroad On-Line
Illinois Central Resource Page
STB decision, docket number FD_33556_0 (granting CN control of the IC)
 Illinois Central Railroad Company Archives at the Newberry Library
Guide to the Illinois Central Gulf Railroad. Memorabilia, 1857–1971. 5197. Kheel Center for Labor-Management Documentation and Archives, Martin P. Catherwood Library, Cornell University.
Encyclopedia of Chicago "Illinois Central Railroad".
 Illinois Central Railroad Collection , McLean County Museum of History
Guide to Tracy W. Simpson, Electrification Project : The Illinois Central Railroad Company Suburban Service at Chicago, Ill. 1909 at the University of Chicago Special Collections Research Center

 
Railway companies established in 1851
Railway companies disestablished in 1972
Railway companies established in 1988
Canadian National Railway subsidiaries
Predecessors of the Canadian National Railway
Former Class I railroads in the United States
Railroads in the Chicago metropolitan area
Rail lines receiving land grants
Defunct companies based in Chicago
Defunct Alabama railroads
Defunct Arkansas railroads
Defunct Illinois railroads
Defunct Indiana railroads
Defunct Iowa railroads
Defunct Kentucky railroads
Defunct Louisiana railroads
Defunct Minnesota railroads
Defunct Mississippi railroads
Defunct Missouri railroads
Defunct Nebraska railroads
Defunct South Dakota railroads
Defunct Tennessee railroads
Defunct Wisconsin railroads
Superfund sites in Tennessee
Non-operating common carrier freight railroads in the United States
1851 establishments in Illinois
American companies established in 1851
1998 mergers and acquisitions